All Saints' Cathedral, Nairobi is a Cathedral of the Anglican Church of Kenya (ACK).

Background
The CMS missionary Johann Ludwig Krapf arrived in 1844 and established a mission station at Rabai. Bishop William Peel  conducted the first Anglican service in Nairobi in 1900. In 1902 the Rev. Philip Alfred Bennett arrived as Chaplain. The first church was consecrated in 1904.

During the Daniel arap Moi administration, the Release Political Prisoners party was formed in the early 1990s to secure the release of political prisoners of the Moi regime, and to protest state-sanctioned torture and random imprisonment. The police dispersed the protestors and many of the mothers of these political prisoners from Freedom Corner in Uhuru Park on 3 March 1992. After a year-long vigil and hunger strike by many of the mothers of these political prisoners in All Saints' Cathedral near Uhuru Park, the government released 51 prisoners en masse in early 1993.

Building
In July 1914 a public meeting  was held to raise money for a permanent church in the centre of Nairobi; and the Foundation Stone for the Church of All Saints was laid on 3 February 1917. A year later Bishop Richard Heywood dedicated the incomplete new Church. In November 1924, the Church of All Saints became the Cathedral of the Highlands. Further portions of the building were completed in 1934 and in 1952. That year All Saints' Cathedral was finally consecrated  by Bishop Richard Crabbe.

References

Anglicanism in Kenya
Cathedrals in Kenya
Anglican cathedrals in Kenya
Religious buildings and structures in Nairobi